Edmond Blanc (22 February 1856 – 12 December 1920) was a horse breeder as well a French politician. He served as a member of the Chamber of Deputies from 1893 to 1894, and from 1898 to 1902, representing Hautes-Pyrénées. He also served as the mayor of La Celle Saint-Cloud. He was the owner of several stud farms in La Celle Saint-Cloud, Haras Villebon and Haras Hardy. He built the racecourse of Saint-Cloud inaugurated in 1901 along with a horse training center named La Fouilleuse. He won the Grand Prix de Paris seven times.

The Prix Edmond Blanc at the Saint-Cloud Racecourse is named in his memory.

References

1856 births
1920 deaths
Politicians from Paris
French republicans
Members of the 6th Chamber of Deputies of the French Third Republic
Members of the 7th Chamber of Deputies of the French Third Republic
Mayors of places in Île-de-France
French racehorse owners and breeders
Blanc family